Kamishak Bay (Alutiiq: Qameksaq) is a bay on the coast of Alaska in the United States.

The proposed United States Navy seaplane tender USS Kamishak (AVP-44) was named for Kamishak Bay, but the contract for the ship's construction was cancelled in 1943 before construction began.

References

 (ship namesake paragraph)

Bays of Alaska
Bodies of water of Kenai Peninsula Borough, Alaska